Unguturu is a village in Eluru district of the Indian state of Andhra Pradesh. It is located in Unguturu mandal of Eluru revenue division. Vasuki Sunkavalli of this village was elected Miss India Universe in 2011. It is located 12 km from the nearest town, Tadepalligudem. As per the 2011 census of India, the village is spread over 4405 hectares with 3912 houses and a population of 14280. The number of males in the village is 7143, the number of females is 7137. The number of Scheduled Castes is 3349 and the number of Scheduled Tribes is 130.

Census
According to the 2001 census, the population of the village was 13057. The population consisted of 6586 males, 6471 females and 3492 households in the village.

Education
There is a private school in the village. There are 10 government primary schools, two government high schools, and one government secondary school. There is a government arbitrary educational center. The nearest government arts and science degree college and vocational training school is located in Chebrole. Nearest junior colleges, engineering colleges, management colleges are located in Tadepalligudem. The nearest medical college, Divyangu special school, is in Eluru and Polytechnic college in Tanuku.

Medical facilities

Government facilities
There are no doctors in the two primary healthcare sub-centers in Ungutur. There are five paramedical staff. There are no doctors in ayurvedic hospital. Ayurvedic medicines are distributed for free. The primary health center is situated in Narayanapuram about 3 km from the village. There is another primary health center at Kaagupadu about 3 km from the village. Nearest Social Health Center, Mata Child Care Center, T. B is about 10 km from the hospital village.  Allopathy Hospital, Alternative Medicine Hospital, Dispensary, Veterinary Hospital, and Family Welfare Center is 10 km from the village.

Private facilities
The village has a small private medical facility for first aid. There are two MBBS doctors and four doctors without a degree. There are four pharmacies.

Drinking Water 
Protected drinking water is being supplied by panchayat to every house in the village. Water from wells is also available. Drinking water is also made supplied by private distributors. There is a private water purifier tank which supplies drinking water for 2 rupees per liter.

Sanitation 
There is no underground drainage system. Sewage flows through open drains.  The sewage is flowing directly into the canals. A complete sanitation scheme is being implemented in the village. There is no social toilet facility. There is no recycling system for the home. There is no social biogas production system. Garbage disposal is being taken care of by panchayat with wet and dry waste segregation as part of Swachh Bharat Mission

Communications, transport facilities  
There is a post office facility, post and telegraph office in Ungutur (534411).  BSNL Landline, public phone mobile phone, private courier, etc are available in the village. The Internet Cafe / General Service Center is located at Chebrole, a distance of 3 km from the village. There is a Meeseva center in the village. There are APSRTC bus services available from Tadepalligudem to Eluru which passes through the village. There are auto facilities from nearby villages. The village users tractors for agriculture. There is a railway station, where passenger trains halt. The national highway AH45, state highway, main district road, and district road pass through the village. The village has asphalt roads, gravel roads, and muddy roads. The nearest gas station is in Narayanapuram. Nearest airports are in Vijayawada and Rajamahendravaram

Finance  
The village has Union Bank of India and its ATM. The village has a self-help group, a civilian supplies center, and a weekly Monday market. The Co-operative Bank and Agricultural Lending Society are located at 3 km from the village in Narayanapuram. Daily Market, Agricultural Marketing Society is in Bhimadole at a distance of 10 km from the village.

Health and recreational facilities 
The village has an integrated child development scheme, Anganwadi Center, other nutrition centers and Asha activists. Newspaper distribution takes place in the village. There are assembly, parliament polling stations, birth-death registration office and Mandal revenue office in the village. There is a library and a public reading room in the village. Nearby cinema halls are located at Tadepalligudem and Ganapavaram.

Electricity 
The village has a power supply for household needs. Electricity is supplied for 7 hours a day for agriculture and 18 hours for commercial purposes.

Land 
Land use in Ungutur is as follows:
•	Forest: 1226 hectares
•	Land under non-agricultural use: 346 hectares
•	Barren land: 39 hectares
•	Permanent pastures, other grazing land: 37 hectares
•	Gardens, etc. Extent of land: 64 hectares
•	non-cultivated lands: 60 hectares
•	Wasteland: 347 hectares
•	Sown land: 2282 hectares
•	Waterless land: 408 hectares
•	Irrigated land from various sources: 2281 hectares

Irrigation facilities 
The water supply to agriculture in Ungutur is going through the following sources.
•	Canals: 780 hectares
•	Wells / Borewells: 1500 hectares

Religious places 
The Bhimeshwara Swamy Temple, a shrine of Lord Shiva, is in Ungutur. There is also a Venkateswara Swamy Temple in the same temple compound. Sri Challalamma Temple, the village deity, is situated in the center of the village. Annual celebrations are held every year during Ugadi for 5 days. Deities are paraded in the village starting from the Tallapragada family, which is considered to be the deity’s birth home. There is another annual festival celebrated on the day of Subramanya Shashti. There is a Bhadrakali Ammavari Temple on the way to Ravulaparru. There are mosques and churches in the village. Dwaraka Tirumala is a famous shrine of Lord Venkateswara located around 30 kilometers from the village.

Economy

Agriculture

Agriculture is one of the main occupation with paddy being the main crop. Main crops are paddy and sugarcane. Sugarcane from the village is primarily exported to Andhra Sugars, Tanuku. There are several small scale factories which produce ice, paper cartons in the village

References

Villages in Eluru district
Mandal headquarters in Eluru district